Matilda May "Tillie" Forney (May 17, 1862 - June 25, 1922) was an author and journalist.

Early life
Matilda May "Tillie" Forney was born in Washington, D. C., on May 17, 1862. She was the youngest child of the eminent journalist, Colonel John Weiss Forney (1817-1881), founder and editor of the Philadelphia Press, a man who wielded an acknowledged great political and social influence. His daughter, having inherited many of her distinguished father's tastes and ambitions, became his almost constant companion after leaving Miss Carr's celebrated academy on the Old York Road, Pennsylvania. 

She was raised in a home of luxury, the Forney library was one of the finest in Philadelphia. Her mother,  Elizabeth Matilda Reitzel (1820-1897), was an accomplished lady of the old school, and she and her daughter were both social favorites.

Career
Tillie May Forney wrote for publication from early girlhood, and she then took up the task systematically and wrote regularly for prominent journals, besides acting frequently as her father's amanuensis, both in this country and in Europe. Under his experienced eye she received careful training for the work she preferred above all others. 

No accomplishment suitable to her sex was neglected in her education. She possesses a voice of unusual range and sweetness, and at that period it was her teacher's wish that all her interest should be centered on her musical talent, but it seemed impossible for her to drop her pen. She grows fonder of her literary duties every year, and was a constant contributor to New York, Philadelphia and western dailies, besides writing regularly for several well-known magazines. 

Together with her brother, John W. Forney, Jr., Forney published The Progress. She was the editor of Table Talk.

Personal life
Tillie May Forney resided with her widowed mother in the old family residence, on 618 Locust Street, Washington Square (Philadelphia). 

She died on June 25, 1922, and is buried with her parents at West Laurel Hill Cemetery, Bala Cynwyd.

References

1862 births
1922 deaths
American women journalists
Burials at West Laurel Hill Cemetery
Journalists from Washington, D.C.
Wikipedia articles incorporating text from A Woman of the Century
19th-century American journalists
19th-century American women writers
20th-century American journalists
20th-century American women writers
Journalists from Pennsylvania
Writers from Philadelphia